Shykat Ali (born 20 December 1993) is a Bangladeshi cricketer. He was born in Manikganj District, Bangladesh. He was selected to play for Dhaka Dynamites in the Bangladesh Premier League in 2015.

References

External links
 
 

1993 births
Living people
Bangladeshi cricketers
People from Manikganj District
Dhaka Dominators cricketers
Mohammedan Sporting Club cricketers
Prime Bank Cricket Club cricketers